Fritz Creek is a census-designated place (CDP) in the Kenai Peninsula Borough, Alaska, United States, northeast of Homer. At the 2020 census the population was 2,248, up from 1,932 in 2010.

Geography
It sits on the north side of Kachemak Bay and is bordered to the southwest by the city of Kachemak, to the west by the Diamond Ridge CDP, and to the northeast by the Fox River CDP.

Demographics

Fritz Creek first appeared on the 1970 U.S. Census as an unincorporated village. In 1980 it was made a census-designated place (CDP).

As of the census of 2000, there were 1,603 people, 661 households, and 413 families residing in the CDP. There were 854 housing units at an average density of 15.7/sq mi (6.1/km2). The racial makeup of the CDP was 93.0% White, 0.2% Black or African American, 2.4% Native American, 0.6% Asian, 0.9% from other races, and 3.1% from two or more races.  2.3% of the population were Hispanic or Latino of any race.

There were 661 households, out of which 36.0% had children under the age of 18 living with them, 52.3% were married couples living together, 7.0% had a female householder with no husband present, and 37.4% were non-families. 29.7% of all households were made up of individuals, and 3.0% had someone living alone who was 65 years of age or older.  The average household size was 2.43 and the average family size was 3.06.

In the CDP, the population was spread out, with 29.8% under the age of 18, 4.4% from 18 to 24, 30.4% from 25 to 44, 29.8% from 45 to 64, and 5.6% who were 65 years of age or older.  The median age was 38 years. For every 100 females, there were 103.7 males.  For every 100 females age 18 and over, there were 109.1 males.

The median income for a household in the CDP was $41,400, and the median income for a family was $49,881. Males had a median income of $42,083 versus $31,250 for females. The per capita income for the CDP was $18,937.  About 3.6% of families and 9.6% of the population were below the poverty line, including 11.4% of those under age 18 and 3.4% of those age 65 or over.

See also
 Alaska: The Last Frontier

References

Census-designated places in Alaska
Census-designated places in Kenai Peninsula Borough, Alaska
Populated coastal places in Alaska on the Pacific Ocean